The Apulo-Calabrese is a breed of black domestic pig from Calabria, in southern Italy. It may also be known as the Calabrese, Nero Calabrese or Nero di Calabria, and by many other regional names. It derives from the old Pugliese pig breed of Puglia, which in turn derives from the Casertana breed of Campania; it is closely related to that breed. The Apulo-Calabrese is one of the six autochthonous pig breeds recognised by the Ministero delle Politiche Agricole Alimentari e Forestali, the Italian ministry of agriculture and forestry.

History
The Apulo-Calabrese is particularly associated with the provinces of  Catanzaro, Cosenza and Reggio di Calabria, and with the area of Lagonegro in the province of Potenza. In the early 20th century, local sub-types from these areas were known as the Catanzarese, the Cosentina, the Reggitana and the Lagonegrese respectively; these types are now considered extinct. The Calabrese was the principal pig of the region; in the mid-1920s the population was recorded as 131,736. Numbers fell drastically after the Second World War, and in particular from the 1970s, following the introduction of faster-growing foreign breeds such as the British Yorkshire. 

A herdbook was established in 2001, and is kept by the Associazione Nazionale Allevatori Suini, the Italian national association of pig breeders. The population remains low: at the end of 2007 it was 499, and conservation status of the breed was listed as "endangered-maintained" by the FAO in the same year. In 2012 total numbers were reported to be 2198.

References

Pig breeds originating in Italy
Italian products with protected designation of origin